The Porsche 911 GT1 is a car designed and developed by German automobile manufacturer Porsche AG to compete in the GT1 class of sportscar racing, which also required a street-legal version for homologation purposes. The limited-production street-legal version developed as a result was named the 911 GT1 Straßenversion (Street version).

History 

With the revival of international sportscar racing in the mid-1990s through the BPR Global GT Series (which then morphed into the FIA GT Championship) Porsche expressed interest in returning to top-level sportscar racing and went about developing its competitor for the GT1 category. Cars in this category were previously heavily modified versions of road cars, such as the McLaren F1 and the Ferrari F40.  Porsche originally modified the 993 GT2 into EVO version and homologated it as a GT1, but it was completely uncompetitive compared to the supercars in its class.

911 GT1 

In spite of its 911 moniker, the car actually had very little in common with the 911 of the time, only sharing the front and rear headlamps with the production sports car. However, its frontal chassis is based on the 993-generation 911, while the rear subframe was derived from the 962C along with its water-cooled, twin-turbocharged and intercooled, 4 valves per cylinder  flat-six engine fuel fed by Bosch Motronic 5.2 fuel injection, which was longitudinally-mounted in a rear mid-engine, rear-wheel-drive layout, compared to the rear-engine, rear-wheel-drive layout of a conventional 911. In comparison, the 993 generation 911 GT2, which was otherwise the company's highest-performance vehicle at the time, used an air-cooled engine with only two valves per cylinder.

The 911 GT1 made its debut in the BPR Global GT Series (the FIA championship's predecessor) at the Brands Hatch 4 hours, where Hans-Joachim Stuck and Thierry Boutsen won comfortably, although they were racing as an invited entry and were thus ineligible for points. They followed up by winning at Spa and Ralf Kelleners and Emmanuel Collard triumphed for the factory team at Zhuhai.

The 1996 911 GT1 clocked at a top speed of exactly  on the legendary Mulsanne Straight in the practice sessions of the 1996 Le Mans 24 Hours Race.

911 GT1 Evo 

Towards the end of the 1996 season, Porsche made revisions to the 911 GT1 in preparation for the 1997 season. The front end of the car was revised including new bodywork which featured headlamps that previewed the all-new generation of the (996) Porsche 911 which would be unveiled in 1997. The revised car was known as the 911 GT1 Evo (or Evolution). At Le Mans the works cars led the race but did not last the full distance; a privately entered 1996 specification GT1 managed 5th overall and third in its class.

911 GT1-98 

For the 1998 season, Porsche developed an all-new car, the 911 GT1-98. Designed to match the also new Toyota GT-One and Mercedes-Benz CLK-GTR, the 911 GT1-98 featured bodywork that bore more of a resemblance to traditional sports-prototypes than the previous two models. A new sequential gearbox was installed to reduce shift time. Engine control also moved to a TAG Electronic Systems TAG 3.8 ECU. As per the regulations, a street-legal version of the 911 GT1-98 was spawned but it is believed that only one variant was produced which was still sufficient to satisfy the new regulations.

During the 1998 FIA International GT season, the 911 GT1-98 struggled to match the pace of the Mercedes, which also was improved, with the main reason being down to the air-restrictor rules which were regarded as unfavourable to the turbocharged engine (the Mercedes had a naturally aspirated V8 engine). The Michelin tyres of the factory team and especially the Pirelli of the private Zakspeed team were also considered inferior to the Bridgestone tyres of the Mercedes.

At the 1998 Le Mans, however, it was a different story. The BMW V12 LM retired with wheel bearing trouble, and the Mercedes CLK-LM cars had oil pump troubles in the new V8 engines that replaced the former V12. The Toyota GT-One, which was considered to be the fastest car, also suffered gearbox reliability problems.

The 911 GT1-98, despite being slower than the Toyota or the Mercedes, fulfilled Porsche's slim hopes, taking both first and second place overall thanks to reliability, giving Porsche its record-breaking 16th overall win at Le Mans, more than any other manufacturer in history.

At the Petit Le Mans race in Road Atlanta, the 911 GT1-98 of Yannick Dalmas made a spectacular backward flip and landed rear first before hitting the side barriers, as did the BMW V12 LMR at the same race in 2000, and most infamously the Mercedes-Benz CLR at Le Mans in 1999.

However, in the 1998 Le Mans 24 Hours test days, the car hit  on the Mulsanne Straight on a lower downforce setup.

1999 
With Mercedes dominating FIA GT1 in 1998, all other entries including Porsche withdrew for the 1999 season. The GT1 class was cancelled, and the FIA GT Championship was contested with GT2 cars. Porsche could have entered at Le Mans, but chose not to try to defend the win of 1998 against the new entrants from other manufacturers.

Champion Racing brought a 911 GT1 Evo to America to race in the American Le Mans Series, but was only allowed to do so as an LMP (Le Mans Prototypes) class entry, where it proved uncompetitive against actual prototypes such as the BMW V12 LMR.

Gunnar G-99 
Following Champion's purchase of a 911 GT1 Evo for 1999, Gunnar Racing offered a custom race car to the team with intentions to race in 2000. The car, known as the Gunnar G-99, was a custom-built 911 GT1 with an open cockpit. The chassis was made from scratch yet remained nearly identical to the 911 GT1 mechanically, even using the bulk of the body parts. A large rollbar was put over the open cockpit to help protect the driver. A 3.6-litre flat-6, from a Porsche 911 GT3, was used in place of the standard 911 GT1 unit.

However, Champion would instead turn to buy a Lola B2K/10, so the Gunnar G-99 was temporarily abandoned. The car would resurface in the Rolex Sports Car Series in 2002, yet would not be allowed to race until it had a roof again. Therefore, Gunnar Racing rebuilt the car with a near-identical GT1 roof, and briefly competed in 2003. The car would take a best finish of second in class twice before being retired due to lack of funding and due to the ban on SRP cars in favour of Daytona Prototypes.

Street-legal version 

Regulations for the GT1 category stipulated that to be eligible, a total of 25 cars must be built for road use. 

Porsche developed two prototype cars, both fully road-legal versions. The first was delivered in early 1996 to the German Federal Ministry of Transport, Building, and Urban Development for compliance testing, which it passed. The second prototype vehicle is in the hands of a Bahrain-based private car collector Khalid Abdul Rahim. These two cars feature 993 style front headlights.

The production car - dubbed "911 GT1 Straßenversion" - was a run of approximately 20 units which were built in 1997 and featured 996 style front headlights. The majority of the production model was finished in Arctic Silver or Fern White, but three cars were finished in unique colours: Polar Silver, Indian Red, and Pastel Yellow.

A single car - the 911 GT1-98 Straßenversion - was built in 1998 to homologate the all-new racing version under the new FIA regulations.

Auto, Motor und Sport tested the street-legal version in 1997 with the following results:

0- : 2.1 seconds
0- : 3.9 seconds
0- : 5.4 seconds
0- : 7.1 seconds
0- : 8.8 seconds
0- : 10.5 seconds
0- : 17.4 seconds
0-: 11.6 seconds
0-: 20.7 seconds
Top speed: 
Braking from : 
Braking from : 
Curb weight:

References

External links 

Official Porsche History of Racing Cars website
1996 Porsche 911 GT1 at official Porsche website
1997 Porsche 911 GT1 Evo at official Porsche website
 1998 Porsche 911 GT1 '98 at official Porsche website

Grand tourer racing cars
Le Mans Prototypes
911 GT1
24 Hours of Le Mans race cars
Le Mans winning cars
911 GT1
Cars powered by boxer engines